"Take the World" is a promotional single released by rapper Tinchy Stryder from this third studio album, Third Strike. The song was co-written by Takeover Entertainment singer-songwriter Ayak Thiik, and produced by TMS who also produced the promotional single Gangsta?. It features vocals from Roc Nation recording artist Bridget Kelly. British singer Cherri V performs Kelly's part when the song is performed live. Prior to the song being recorded, Bridget Kelly had in the past regularly filled in for Alicia Keys when performing the song Empire State of Mind with Jay-Z.

Music video

The music video for the song was directed by Adam Powell and Kwasi Danquah III, and was uploaded to Stryder's YouTube channel on Wednesday, 17 November 2010, at a total length of three minutes and forty-two seconds. The video is set in black and white scenes and finds Stryder chopping out his rhymes over big synths and big beats in an empty, dusty warehouse cut with scenes from Battersea Power Station and a ship’s control room for an added cinematic touch. Bridget Kelly makes her music video debut, where she unleashes powerful coloratura soprano vocals.

Release history

References

2010 songs
Tinchy Stryder songs
Songs with music by Tinchy Stryder
Takeover Entertainment singles
Songs written by Ayak Thiik
Song recordings produced by TMS (production team)
Songs written by Tom Barnes (songwriter)
Songs written by Ben Kohn
Songs written by Peter Kelleher (songwriter)
Music videos directed by Adam Powell